Bakhtiyor Hamidullaev (born 7 March 1978 in Andijan, USSR (now Uzbekistan) is a former Uzbek football and player. He is currently the manager of Andijan.

Career
He played the most time of his career for FK Andijan and is considered as one of the best players of FK Andijan history in modern period. Hamidullaev was Best club top scorer in 1999–2002 and 2006 seasons and also became Uzbek League Top Scorer in 1999 with 24 goals and in 2002 with 22 goals. He scored over 190 goals in Uzbek League, Cup and for national team and member of Gennadi Krasnitsky club of Uzbek top scorers. He finished player career in 2011 and played last season for FK Andijan

International
Bakhtiyor Hamidullaev achieved 8 caps as Uzbekistan national football team player, scoring 3 goals. The most notable of his international appearances was 2001 Merdeka Tournament in Kuala Lumpur, Malaysia where Uzbekistan team won the tournament for the first time. Hamidullaev scored 3 goals in 3 matches. His golden goal in overtime of final match against Bosnia and Herzegovina helped Uzbekistan team win match with 2:1.

Honours

National team
Merdeka Tournament: 2001

Individual
Uzbek League Top Scorer (2): 1999, 2002
Gennadi Krasnitsky club: 191 goals

Career statistics

International
Goals for Senior National Team

External links
 
 Uzbekistan national football team stats (Russian)
 

1978 births
Uzbekistani footballers
Uzbekistan international footballers
Pakhtakor Tashkent FK players
Living people
People from Andijan
Footballers at the 2002 Asian Games
Association football forwards
Asian Games competitors for Uzbekistan